Hoseynabad ( is a village in Deh Abbas Rural District of the Central District of Eslamshahr County, Tehran province, Iran. The National Census in 2011 counted 3,748 people in 966 households. The latest census in 2016 showed a population of 3,899 people in 1,075 households; it was the largest village in its rural district.

References 

Eslamshahr County

Populated places in Tehran Province

Populated places in Eslamshahr County